Nichewaug is a village in Massachusetts. It is part of the town of Petersham. It is close to the Quabbin Reservoir, and close to the former town of Dana, Massachusetts. The village was likely depopulated due to the construction of the nearby reservoir, and has a few houses today. The village has been assigned the zip code of 01366.

References

Villages in Worcester County, Massachusetts
Villages in Massachusetts